Gao Xu (514–545 CE) was a Chinese writer and military leader of Northern and Eastern Wei with the courtesy name "Shuzong".

He was a son of Gao Qianzhi and a grandson of Gao Chong, himself a grandson of King Juqu Mujian of Northern Liang. Gao Xu was eager to learn, and growing up dabbled in book biography. Gao Xu joined the army of Wei as Sikong and was then appointed Changliu canjun. He further served as General Zhenyuan.

He died in the third year of the Wuding Era (545), aged thirty-two.

References

514 births
545 deaths
6th-century Chinese people
6th-century Chinese military personnel
Northern Wei people
Xiongnu